Sheer khurma or sheer khorma ( "milk and dates") is a festival vermicelli pudding prepared by Muslims on Eid ul-Fitr and Eid al-Adha in Pakistan, Afghanistan, India, and parts of Central Asia. It is equivalent to shemai, a Bangladeshi desert. It is a traditional Muslim festive breakfast, and a dessert for celebrations. This dish is made from various dry fruits, vermicelli, condensed milk, sugar etc. Depending on the region, cardamom, pistachios, almonds, cloves, saffron, raisins, and rose water are also added.

This special dish is served on the morning of Eid day in the family after the Eid prayer as breakfast, and throughout the day to all the visiting guests. In its original form, it consists of dates mixed with milk from Iran and dry fruits and nuts from Afghanistan which is where it originated. It is modified in India by the addition of fried semia and caramelised sugar.

Ingredients
The main ingredients used in sheer khurma are vermicelli, whole milk, sugar and dates. Depending on the region, cardamom, pistachios, almonds, cloves, saffron, raisins, and rose water are also added.

Preparation

Vermicelli are fried in clarified butter. Then milk (sheer) is added and the vermicelli are allowed to cook further. As the mixture thickens, sugar and dates are added along with any other dried fruits. In some areas locals opt to use a higher milk to vermicelli ratio because they prefer a thinner drink like consistency

See also
 Afghan cuisine
 Indian cuisine
 Pakistani cuisine

Notes

References

South Asian cuisine
Pakistani cuisine
Indian cuisine
Afghan desserts